West Mecca is an unincorporated community in Trumbull County, in the U.S. state of Ohio.

History
A post office called West Mecca was established in 1875, and remained in operation until 1903. The community was founded sometime later than neighboring Mecca (formerly East Mecca). The name Mecca comes from Mecca, in the Middle East.

References

Unincorporated communities in Trumbull County, Ohio
1875 establishments in Ohio
Populated places established in 1875
Unincorporated communities in Ohio